The men's 3000 metres team event was part of the track and field athletics programme at the 1924 Summer Olympics. It was the third and last appearance of a 3000-metre team race event after the debut in 1912, but the sixth time that a team contest was arranged at the Olympics. The competition was held on Friday, July 11, 1924, and on Sunday, July 13, 1924. Forty-four runners from nine nations competed.

Results

Semifinals

Both semi-finals were held on Friday, July 11, 1924, and the first heat started at 3:15p.m. The top two teams in each heat qualified for the final.

Semifinal 1

Team result

Individual race result

Semifinal 2

Team result:

Individual race result:

Final

The final was held on Sunday, July 13, 1924, and started at 4:45p.m.

Team result:

Individual race result:

References

External links
Olympic Report
 

Men's team race 3000 metres
1924